, also written , is a style of pointed arch or bell-shaped window found in Japanese architecture. It first arrived in Japan from China together with Zen Buddhism, as an element of Zen style architecture, but from the end of the 16th century it started to be used in temples of other Buddhist sects, Shinto shrines, castles, and samurai residences as well. The window initially was not flared, but its design and shape changed over time: the two vertical frames were widened and curves were added at the bottom. The kanji characters used for its name have also changed through the centuries, from the original "fire window" to "flower head window".

The oldest extant example of katōmado can be found in Engaku-ji's Shariden (Relic Hall) in Kamakura, which is thought to closely follow the original style as it was introduced to Japan, with the vertical frames touching the bottom in straight lines. Another well-known example can be found in the room called  in the Main Hall at Ishiyama-dera, Shiga prefecture.

See also
 Glossary of Shinto

Notes

References

Japanese Buddhist architecture
Shinto architecture
Windows